Cynisca  or Kyniska (born c. 442 BC) was a wealthy Spartan princess. She is famous for being the first woman to win at the Olympic Games, competing in the sport of chariot racing. Cynisca first entered the Olympics in 396 BC, where she won first prize competing with a team of horses she had trained herself. In 392 BC, Cynisca entered her horses in the Olympics for a second time and was awarded another victory in the same event.

Etymology 
Cynisca's name means "female puppy" in Ancient Greek, and she was named after her grandfather Zeuxidamus, who was called Cyniscos. It is possible that this name is derived from the hunting traditions of the Spartan elite, or her family's practice of raising hunting dogs.

Early life

Cynisca was born around 442 BC in the ancient Greek city-state of Sparta and was the daughter of the Eurypontid king Archidamus II. Her brother was Agesilaus II, who later succeeded his father and became a king of Sparta. Because of her family's wealth, Cynisca was able to spend time developing her sporting skills and learning how to train horses for chariot racing, paving the way for her future Olympic victories. According to Pausanias, Cynisca was exceedingly ambitious to succeed at the Olympic Games from a young age .

Several sources from Xenophon and Plutarch make mention of how, in her youth, Cynisca's brother Agesilaus encouraged her to breed horses and compete in the games, though his motivations for doing so have recently been debated. According to these ancient sources, Agesilaus supposedly viewed success in chariot racing as a victory without merit. As opposed to other events, where a man's bravery and virtue were the decisive factors, he believed that chariot racing only demonstrated wealth due to the lack of involvement on the part of the horses' owner. Both of these ancient authors suggested that Agesilaus hoped to expose how the sport was unmanly and aristocratic by having a woman win, though in reality Cynisca's victories did not stop wealthy Spartans engaging in the sport. Several modern scholars, on the other hand, have theorized that Agesilaus' motivations were more practical. They suspect that he was simply using her victories and wealth to promote his own political career and gain public support through his association to her, rather than providing a moral lesson. The evidence provided to support this theory is that Cynisca's two Olympic victories would have also brought fame to Agesilaus and to the wider Eurypontid house. Additionally, the establishment of Cynisca's hero-cult after her death could suggest that Agesilaus was still making use of his sister's fame even after her passing.

Olympic Games

In 396 BC, Cynisca employed male charioteers to drive the horses she trained and entered her team at the Olympics for the first time, where it won in the four-horse chariot race (tethrippon Greek: τέθριππον). Cynisca is thought to have been approximately 40 years old when she won her first victory in the Olympics. In 392 BC, Cynisca once again entered her racing team at the Olympic games and secured another victory.

To commemorate her Olympic achievements, Cynisca dedicated a set of bronze statues which depicted herself, her charioteer, her chariot, and her horses at the Temple of Zeus in Olympia. According to Pausanias, these statues were placed in a prominent location in the entrance way of the temple, next to the throne dedicated by Arimnestus a king of Etruria. Along with the statues, Cynisca also celebrated her victories with an inscription, declaring that she was the only woman to win the wreath in the chariot events at the Olympic Games. Cynisca also dedicated another monument with copy of the same inscription in Sparta. The inscription from Olympia (c. 390-380 BC) reads:

English
Kings of Sparta are my father and brothers
I, Kyniska, victorious with a chariot of swift-footed horses,
have erected this statue. I declare myself the only woman
in all Hellas to have won this crown.
Apelleas son of Kallikles made it.

Ancient Greek

Pausanias also mentions an epigram of unknown authorship to Cynisca, which he claims was the only poetic composition ever written to commemorate the deeds of the royal houses of the Lacedaemonians. In addition to this, a heroön (hero-shrine) was erected for Cynisca in Sparta at Plane-tree Grove, where religious ceremonies were held. Previously, only Spartan kings had been graced in this way and Cynisca was the first woman to receive this honor.

Cultural context 
While most women in the ancient Greek world were kept in seclusion and forbidden to pursue athletic activities such as riding or hunting, Spartan women of the elite spartiate class were trained to excel in sports. The greater freedom that spartiate women experienced in terms of athletic pursuits was largely due to the fact that they were able to dedicate significant amounts of time to their training, since the helot system, where the majority of the population were kept in slavery, relieved them of the typical household duties that most other Greek women were expected to attend to. High levels of female athleticism were encouraged in Sparta because as a society, they believed that strong women would produce strong children and supply the army with powerful soldiers.

Despite the greater level of social freedom that spartiate women enjoyed, participation in Olympic Games remained almost entirely restricted to men. There is debate about whether women were even allowed to attend the games as spectators. Several passages from Pausanias shed light on this issue, as he suggests that parthenai (young, unmarried women) were allowed to attend the Olympics as spectators, but gynaikes (married women) were barred from entering. In terms of competing in the Olympic games, women were only allowed to enter the equestrian events, not by participating themselves, but rather by owning and training the horses.

However, while it was rare for women to compete against men in athletic games, as Cynisca did, there is evidence to suggest that separate athletic competitions existed for women in the Greek world. The existence of these competitions is supported by Pausanias' mention of a number of bronze statues dedicated by victorious female runners (mostly Spartan) at the temple of Hera at Elis, as well as several stone inscriptions that have been uncovered.

Cynisca's cultural impact

Based on archaeological evidence such as the locations of her dedications and hero-cult, as well as the speculation of modern scholars, Cynisca's win at the Olympics likely had a great impact on women across the Greek world, not only her fellow Lacedaemonians. After Cynisca's victory several other Greek women went on to achieve varying levels of success in the sport of chariot racing, including Euryleonis, Belistiche, Zeuxo, Encrateia and Hermione, Timareta, Theodota, and Cassia. However, according to Pausanias, none of these women gained greater recognition for their victories than Cynisca. When Berenike of Egypt won in the four-horse chariot race at the Olympics in the early third century BCE, she commissioned an epigram by the poet Posidippus in which she explicitly claimed to have "stolen" the fame (κῦδος) of Cynisca. Her epigram was included in the so-called Greek Anthology, which also indicates its continuing relevance long after the victory itself.

Some scholars have also suggested that Cynisca's Olympic victories and heroic qualities were likely also honoured by men, based on the fact that her heroön was placed in a prominent location near the Platanistas, the exercise grounds for male Spartan youths.

In modern times, Cynisca has been commemorated by the Greek poet Zoe Karelli, who wrote a poem about her love for horses and the Olympic victory which made her name famous in Greek history.

Cynisca was also one of the women included in Judy Chicago's 1979 contemporary feminist art exhibit titled The Dinner Party.

In the sporting world, her name has been adopted by the "Kyniska Hoops" amateur girls basketball organization, which was founded in 2009 and strives to empower young female athletes.

See also

Euryleonis – another celebrated Spartan woman who won the two horse chariot races in 368 BC.
List of ancient Olympic victors

Notes

References

Bibliography
Paul Cartledge, The Spartans: An Epic History,  2nd edition 2003. 
Stephen Hodkinson, Property and Wealth in Classical Sparta, The Classical Press of Wales, 2000. 
S. B. Pomeroy. Spartan Women (Oxford ; New York : Oxford University Press, 2002).
G. P. Schauss and S. R. Wenn (eds).  Onward to the Olympics: Historical Perspectives on the Olympic Games (Waterloo, Ont., Canada:   Wilfrid Laurier University Press, 2007).

External links

Cynisca inscription exhibit at the Museum of the History of the Olympic Games of antiquity
Spartan Olympic Victors
Inscriptions mentioning Cynisca
Pausanias, Description of Greece, online at Perseus
Brooklyn Museum Heritage Floor entry on Cynisca

Year of death missing
5th-century BC Spartans
5th-century BC Greek women
Spartan princesses
Ancient Olympic competitors
Ancient Greek chariot racers
Ancient Spartan women
Ancient Spartan athletes
Sportswomen in antiquity
Greek racehorse owners and breeders
440s BC births
Eurypontid dynasty